Gmajna is a formerly independent settlement in the northern part of the capital Ljubljana in central Slovenia. It is part of the traditional region of Upper Carniola and is now included with the rest of the municipality in the Central Slovenia Statistical Region.

Geography
Gmajna lies below the southwest slope of Hrastovec Hill, north of the center of Črnuče.

Name
The name Gmajna means 'commons', referring to land that was jointly owned and used by the village community. The Slovenian common noun gmajna is a borrowing from Middle High German gemeine, with the same meaning, and is found in other Slovene toponyms such as Gmajna near Slovenj Gradec as well as in the diminutive form Gmajnica.

History
Gmajna had a population of 108 in 1900, and 135 in 1931. Gmajna was annexed by Črnuče in 1953, ending its existence as an independent settlement. Črnuče itself was annexed by Ljubljana in 1980.

References

External links
Gmajna on Geopedia

Localities of Ljubljana
Črnuče District